Mourad Slatni (born 5 February 1966) is an Algerian footballer. He played in 15 matches for the Algeria national football team in 1995 and 1996. He was also named in Algeria's squad for the 1996 African Cup of Nations tournament.

References

External links
 

1966 births
Living people
Algerian footballers
Algeria international footballers
1996 African Cup of Nations players
Place of birth missing (living people)
Association footballers not categorized by position
21st-century Algerian people